Scarus frenatus is a species of parrotfish. Common names include bridled parrotfish, sixband or six-banded parrotfish or vermiculate parrotfish.

Description
This species grows to a maximum length of  47 cm, and can be distinguished by its patterns and colouration. Its appearance changes during its life phases. During the initial phase, it has a reddish to brown colour, six to seven dark, horizontal stripes along its body, and red fins. In males, during the terminal phase, the posterior of the body and the lower half of the head appear abruptly lighter. Also, in males, the caudal fins appear blue-green with a large, orange, crescent-shaped area.

Distribution
Scarus frenatus is found in the Indo-Pacific region from the Red Sea to the Line Islands and Ducie Island, and as far north as southern Japan, to its southernmost location at Shark Bay in Western Australia, Lord Howe Island, and Rapa Iti in French Polynesia. It is not found in the waters of Hawaii.

Habitat and behavior
Normally, the bridled parrotfish occurs at depths of 1–25 m on exposed outer reefs, occasionally in extremely shallow water. Juvenile specimens may be found in lagoons living within the rubble and coral of the reefs.  This species is generally a solitary fish. While feeding, it may join schools of mixed species.  It grazes on algae growing in the benthic zone.

References

External links

 Map showing occurrences in Australian waters
 

frenatus
Taxa named by Bernard Germain de Lacépède
Fish described in 1802
Fish of the Atlantic Ocean